"Buzz Back Girl" is a song recorded by American country music artist Jerrod Niemann. It was released in July 2014 as the third single from his third major-label studio album High Noon following the critical and commercial failure of its previous single "Donkey". The song was written by Lee Brice, Kyle Jacobs and Phillip Lammonds.

Critical reception
Carrie Horton of Taste of Country gave the song a positive review, saying that "With ‘Buzz Back Girl’ Niemann has traded in the auto-tune sound of ‘Donkey’ and ‘Drink to That All Night’ for a more traditional country sound, but still holds on to the rock ‘n roll vibe that makes him unique."

Music video
The music video was directed by Eric Welch and premiered in October 2014.

Chart performance
The song peaked at number 35 on the Country Airplay chart.

References

2014 songs
2014 singles
Jerrod Niemann songs
Arista Nashville singles
Songs written by Lee Brice
Songs written by Kyle Jacobs (songwriter)